The Eternal Mother is a lost 1920 American silent melodrama film directed by Will S. Davis and starring stage veteran Florence Reed.

Penultimate film directed by Davis before his death in 1920.

Cast
Florence Reed as Laura West
Lionel Atwill as Howard Hollister
Gareth Hughes as Stephen Rhodes
Jere Austin
Robert Broderick

References

External links

 

1920 films
American silent feature films
Films directed by Will S. Davis
Lost American films
American black-and-white films
1920 drama films
Silent American drama films
Melodrama films
1920 lost films
Lost drama films
1920s American films